Emilien A. Levesque (1922 – August 21, 2003) was an American politician from Maine. Levesque, a Democrat from Madawaska, served five terms (1960–1970) in the Maine House of Representatives. He spent his final three terms in leadership, including one term as House Majority Leader (1964–1966) and two as House Minority Leader (1966–1970).

Levesque was born in 1922 in Grand Isle, Maine. He attended high school in Van Buren, Maine. He was drafted into the United States Army to fight in World War II in 1943. During the war, Levesque saw action primarily in Italy and Germany before being taken prisoner in Germany. He was released from the prisoner hospital in 1945. Levesque was of French-Canadian descent, as was the majority of residents of the St. John Valley area of northern Maine.

References

1922 births
2003 deaths
People from Madawaska, Maine
Maine Democrats
Majority leaders of the Maine House of Representatives
Minority leaders of the Maine House of Representatives
American people of French-Canadian descent
United States Army personnel of World War II
American prisoners of war in World War II
20th-century American politicians
World War II prisoners of war held by Germany